Muirkirk is a village in East Ayrshire, Scotland. 

Muirkirk may refer to:

 Muirkirk, Maryland, USA
 Muirkirk railway station, Scotland
 Muirkirk (MARC station), USA
 Muirkirk F.C.

See also
 Muirkirk Enterprise Group
 Muirkirk & North Lowther Uplands Special Protection Area
 Muir (disambiguation)
 Kirk (disambiguation)